Ulf Einarsson (born 27 July 1981) is a Swedish bandy player who currently plays for Åby/Tjureda.

References

External links
 Ulf Einarsson at bandysidan
 vetlanda bk

Swedish bandy players
Expatriate bandy players in Russia
Swedish expatriate sportspeople in Russia
Living people
1981 births
Vetlanda BK players
IF Boltic players
Dynamo Kazan players
Hammarby IF Bandy players